The UCL Faculty of Life Sciences is one of the 11 constituent faculties of University College London (UCL).

History
The roots of UCL’s Faculty of Life Sciences can be traced back to 1826, when the Chairs of Botany and Comparative Anatomy were established; with the Departments of Zoology, Cell Biology, Genetics, Botany and Microbiology all stemming from the Chair of Botany.

Since the Faculty’s establishment it has contributed to many major breakthroughs in history including Nobel Prize winner, James Black, work on β-blockers and histamine H2 receptor antagonists.

Most recently, the School of Pharmacy, established in 1842, merged with UCL in 2012, becoming one of two divisions within the Faculty of Life Sciences.

Departments and divisions

The Faculty currently comprises the following departments, divisions and institutes:

UCL Division of Biosciences
UCL Research Department of Cell and Developmental Biology
UCL Research Department of Genetics, Evolution and Environment
UCL Research Department of Neuroscience, Physiology and Pharmacology
UCL Research Department of Structural and Molecular Biology
Laboratory for Molecular Cell Biology (LMCB) at UCL
Gatsby Computational Neuroscience Unit
UCL School of Pharmacy
Sainsbury Wellcome Centre for Neural Circuits and Behaviour

Rankings
In the 2021 QS World University Rankings by Faculty, UCL is ranked 10th in the world (and 1st in London) for Life Sciences and Medicine. In the 2021 Subject QS World University Rankings UCL is ranked 7th in the world (and 1st in London) for Pharmacy and Pharmacology.

UCL came top for research power in the main panels of ‘medicine, health and life sciences’ and ‘social sciences’ according to the Research Excellence Framework 2021 (REF).

UCL is also ranked 10th in the world for Biological Sciences and 5th in the world for Pharmacy and Pharmaceutical Sciences in the 2021 Shanghai Rankings.

Notable alumni and staff
There are currently six Nobel Prize winners amongst the Faculty's alumni and current and former staff.

Current staff 
David Attwell
Nadia Bukhari
David Colquhoun
Stuart Cull-Candy
Rob Horne
Steve Jones
John O'Keefe
Rosalind Raine
Geraint Rees
Claudio Stern
Seirian Sumner
Gabriel Waksman
Semir Zeki
Ijeoma Uchegbu
Frances Brodsky
Susan Evans
Kate Jones
Linda Partridge
Tara Keck
Christine Orengo
Matthew Todd
Annette Dolphin
Maria Fitzgerald
Abdul Waseh Basit
Muki Haklay

Alumni/deceased 

 Dame Georgina Mace
 Rebeccah Slater
 Carla J. Shatz
 Gillian Griffiths
 Mary Collins
 Nigel Bonner 
 Andrew Huxley

References

External links
UCL Faculty of Life Sciences
MRC Laboratory for Molecular Cell Biology at UCL
University College London

Biology education in the United Kingdom
Departments of University College London